Eucalantica pumila is a moth in the family Yponomeutidae. It is found in Costa Rica (Heredia, Barva Volcano).

The length of the forewings is about 5.8 mm.

Etymology
The specific epithet is derived from the Latin pumilus (meaning little) and refers to its small size relative to other Eucalantica species.

References

Moths described in 2011
Yponomeutidae